Clanis stenosema is a species of moth of the family Sphingidae first described by Rothschild and Jordan in 1907. It is known from Nias, Sumatra, Java, Borneo and the Philippines.

References

Clanis
Moths described in 1907